Steven Doege (born January 22, 1991 in Kelowna, British Columbia) is a professional Canadian football defensive end for the BC Lions of the Canadian Football League. He attended the Lions' 2012 training camp as a territorial exemption and spent time on the team's practice roster that year. He re-signed with the Lions on November 29, 2012. He played junior football with the Okanagan Sun.

References

External links
BC Lions bio

1991 births
Living people
BC Lions players
Canadian football defensive linemen
Canadian Junior Football League players
Players of Canadian football from British Columbia
Sportspeople from Kelowna